The men's 4×100 metre medley relay event at the 11th FINA World Swimming Championships (25m) took place 16 December 2012 at the Sinan Erdem Dome.

Records
Prior to this competition, the existing world and championship records were as follows.

No new records were set during this competition.

Results

Heats

Final

The final was held at 21:16.

References

Medley relay 4x100 metre, men's
World Short Course Swimming Championships